Usman Zada Adra is a village in Tehsil Gujar Khan, District Rawalpindi, Pakistan. It is populated by one family of Chohan Rajputs.

Village is home of brave people who have excelled in different profession i.e teaching, Army, business, civil services, agriculture and farming. There are many people from this village based in the UK, mainly in Manchester, Oxford and Telford and in some other towns. There is also a size able contingent based in the Middle East. Lately there has been a move to emigration to Spain.

See also 
Tribes and clans of the Pothohar Plateau

External links
http://wikimapia.org/1689185/usman-zada-adra

Villages in Gujar Khan Tehsil